Haeckeria is a genus of flowering plants in the family Asteraceae described as a genus in 1853.

 Species
 Haeckeria cassiniiformis F.Muell. - South Australia
 Haeckeria punctata J.H.Willis
 Haeckeria punctulata (F.Muell.) J.H.Willis - South Australia

References

Gnaphalieae
Asteraceae genera
Flora of Australia